Many watermills lined the banks of the River Wey, England, from the 17th century due to the river's ability to provide a reliable, year-round flow of water. These mills chiefly ground wheat, often referred to as corn, for flour and oats for animal feed though many were used in the production of other goods such as paper, cloth, leather, wire and gunpowder. The river was home to more mills per mile than anywhere else in Great Britain. The mill situated at Coxes Lock near Addlestone, Surrey, is the largest. There are many mills on the river's principal tributaries, such as the Tillingbourne, the Ock and some mills on the Whitmore Vale stream, Cranleigh Waters and Hodge Brook. The last commercial mill on the Tillingbourne, Botting's Mill at Albury, closed in 1991. Headley Water Mill, on the Wey South branch is still in business. Town Mill, Guildford still has a water turbine driven generator producing electricity for the town.

Note: The mills are listed from source to mouth for each waterway.

Wey (North branch) mills

Anstey Mill, Alton
National Grid Reference: . Ruined but with the wheel still in place.  It is a Grade II listed building.

Upper Neatham Mill, Holybourne
National Grid Reference: . No trace remains.

Lower Neatham Mill, Alton
National Grid Reference: . Now a private dwelling. It is a Grade II listed building.

Wyck Mill, Froyle
National Grid Reference: . Fulling mill, no trace remains.

Froyle Mill
National Grid Reference: . Fulling mill, no trace remains. The site is now occupied by a residential development.

Isington Mill, Binstead
National Grid Reference: . Now a private dwelling, the former home of General Montgomery. It is a Grade II listed building.

Bentley Mill
National Grid Reference: . Also known as Groveland Mill, or Turk's Farm Mill, it was built in 1640 as a paper mill, but was a fulling mill and a corn mill for some time. It is now a guest house providing bed and breakfast accommodation. The machinery was dismantled around 1915. It is a Grade II listed building.

Willey Mill, Farnham
National Grid Reference: . A Domesday site and a Grade II listed building.

Weydon Mill
National Grid Reference: . Also known as La Medmulle. Ceased milling in 1909 and the mill was demolished in 1919. Now a ruin.

Hatch Mill, Farnham
National Grid Reference: . Also known as Grovelands Mill. Shown on the 1871 Ordnance Survey map as Woodmeadhatch Mill. After milling ceased it became the Farnham Sanitary Laundry. It was then occupied by the West Surrey College of Art and Design and by 2018 was a residential care home. It is a Grade II listed building.

High Mill, Farnham
National Grid Reference: . A corn mill until 1900, it then switched to producing animal feed until its closure in 1950. It is a Grade II listed building.

Waverley Mill
National Grid Reference: . Part of the Abbey estate, it was demolished in 1900. No trace of it remains.

Tilford Mill
National Grid Reference: . Also known as Wanford Mill. The brick footings and the remnants of the mill race are all that remains.

Nadder Stream mills
Bourne Mill, Farnham
National Grid Reference: . Dating to the 17th century, the remaining part of the mill now houses a manufacturing and retail business. It is a Grade II listed building.

Little Bourne Mill, Farnham
National Grid Reference:  A small corn mill fed by the tail race of Bourne Mill. It had ceased operations by the time the railway was built in 1849 and destroyed in a fire some time later.

Rock Mill, Farnham
National Grid Reference: . A corn mill built around 1770 and situated on a stream from Badshot Lea. It ceased operating in 1877, by which time the waterwheel was supplemented by a 10HP Corliss steam engine. A large mill in its time, only the foundations remain.

Wey (South branch) mills

Lowder Mill, Fernhurst
National Grid Reference: . Dated to about 1729, it appears to have ceased working by 1881. Now a private dwelling. It is a Grade II listed building.

Sickle Mill, Shottermill
National Grid Reference: . Originally a paper mill built alongside an earlier hammer mill used by a firm of sickle makers, hence the name. An 1895 map  shows the mill being used for the production of candle wicks and cord. By the 1920s it had ceased to function and was acquired by the Haslemere Urban District Council and used for various purposes.  In 1997 the remaining parts were converted to private housing. It is a Grade II listed building.

Shotter Mill, Shottermill
National Grid Reference: . Originally a fulling mill, later a corn mill. It gave its name to the hamlet that grew up around it, now a suburb of Haslemere. It is a Grade II listed building.

New Mill, Shottermill
National Grid Reference: . A skin mill or tannery, later a paper mill. It ceased operation in 1903 and became derelict, finally being demolished in 1978. No visible trace of the mill remains.

Pitfold Mill, Shottermill
National Grid Reference: . Skin mill or tannery.  It was later used as a saw mill, with its own narrow gauge railway.
The mill was demolished and the site redeveloped in the 1980s.

Pophole Mill
National Grid Reference: . One of the oldest mill sites on the Wey, being mentioned in 1200. By 1573 it was a hammer mill with forge and furnace. By 1777 it had ceased operating. No trace now remains.

Bramshott Corn Mill
National Grid Reference: .

Bramshott Mill
National Grid Reference: . Also known as Passfield Mill. Originally a hammer mill, then a paper mill.

Standford Mill
National Grid Reference: . A paper mill built in 1830, now a private dwelling.

Headley Mill

National Grid Reference: . A corn mill still in commercial operation. It is a Grade II listed Building.

Headley Park Mill
National Grid Reference: . An unusual hexagonal shaped corn mill that operated until the 1890s. In 1904 it was fitted with a dynamo to provide electricity to Headley Park House. A fire in the 1960s left the building derelict.

Frensham Mill
National Grid Reference: . A corn mill built in 1876 to replace an earlier mill on the site. It was demolished in 1922.

River Slea mills

Old Mill, Selborne
National Grid Reference: . A corn mill on the Oakhanger Stream. Now converted to a private dwelling, it is a Grade II listed building.

Dorton Mill, Selborne 
National Grid Reference: . A corn mill on the Oakhanger Stream.

Kingsley Mill
National Grid Reference: . A corn mill situated at the confluence of the Kingsley and Oakhanger Streams. Along with the adjacent mill house it has been converted to a private dwelling. It is a Grade II listed building.

Whitmore Vale Stream mills
Barford Upper Mill
National Grid Reference: . Originally a paper mill and later a flock mill, it is now a private dwelling. It is a Grade II listed building.

Barford Middle Mill
National Grid Reference: . A corn mill. Demolished and replaced by a private dwelling.

Barford Lower Mill
National Grid Reference: . Also known as the Old Mill, Churt. A paper mill, then a flock mill, dating from about 1800–1835. It closed in 1884 and was subsequently demolished. Parts of the building are incorporated into a modern house.

Wey River mills

Elstead Mill
National Grid Reference: . Corn mill, later used by a company producing worsted braid. It was used as a hospital in World War I. In the late twentieth century it started use as a pub. It is a Grade II* listed building.

Cutt Mill
National Grid Reference: . In the grounds of Cutt Mill House, little remains of the mill, which ceased working in the 1930s.

 Cosford Mill, Thursley
National Grid Reference: . Built about 1580. The first recorded owner was Richard Shudd in 1536. Now converted to a domestic accommodation, it is a Grade II listed building.

Silk Mill, Thursley
National Grid Reference: . Operating between 1794 and 1849, it was demolished by 1871.

Eashing Mill
National Grid Reference: . Both a paper mill and corn mill until 1835, after which it was used solely for papermaking. The wheel was replaced by a water turbine in the late 19th century.  It is now used for light engineering.

Salgasson Mill
National Grid Reference: . Originally a corn mill, later used as a fibre mill and tannery. The building has been completely demolished.

Westbrook Mill
National Grid Reference: . Former tannery, fulling mill, and paper mill. In 1881 the waterwheel was used to drive a Siemans generator making Godalming the first town in Britain to be lit by electricity.

Catteshall Mill 
National Grid Reference: . Originally a paper mill, later a fulling mill, corn mill, and foundry. In 1869 the wheel was replaced by a Fourneyron water turbine, thought to be the largest ever produced. When part of the mill was demolished in 1981 the turbine was rescued for possible future display.

Unstead Mill
National Grid Reference: . A roller corn mill alongside Unstead Lock, it ceased operation in 1906 and was subsequently completely demolished.

Town Mill, Guildford

National Grid Reference: . 18th century mill used for corn and pumping water. It is Grade II listed.

Artington Mill
National Grid Reference: . A corn mill that ceased operation in the late 17th century. Situated on the west bank of the river, just upstream of Guildford Bridge. The site is now occupied by a pub. The course of the mill stream is now Millmead Road.

Stoke Mill

National Grid Reference: . 19th-century corn mill now used as offices.

Bower's Mill, Burpham
National Grid Reference: . A paper mill was on this site in 1733 and a corn mill added around 1879. After paper making ceased it became a corn mill and later it was used to produce linseed oil. All milling ceased by 1910 and the mill was demolished in 1945. The building currently on the site, known as Bowers Mill, was built as a laundry for Sutton Place by the Duke of Sutherland.

Gresham Mill, Old Woking
National Grid Reference: . Also known as Woking Mill, it was a paper mill and printing works, now converted into private apartments.

Newark Mill
National Grid Reference: . A mid-17th-century corn mill, it was used as a paper mill between 1855 and 1859.  It closed in 1943 after being bombed in an air raid. It was destroyed by fire in 1966.

Byfleet Mill
National Grid Reference: . An early 19th-century corn mill. It ceased working in 1950 and the machinery was scrapped. The mill building has been restored and is now a Grade II* listed building.

Coxes Lock Mills

National Grid Reference: . The original mill was built in 1776 for working iron. Replaced by a corn and silk mill in 1829, part of which is still extant. This was, in turn, replaced with a large corn mill in 1900 which ground flour for Allied Mills until 1983. The latter has been converted to private dwellings. The two mill buildings are now Grade II listed.

Liberty Mill
National Grid Reference:  A sawmill built in 1843. It drew water from the navigation and discharged it into the Bourne Stream. It continued working well into the 20th century. At one time the Airscrew Company made wooden propellers here and later Weyroc used it for the manufacture of chipboard. The site is now a small industrial estate.

Ham Haw Mill
National Grid Reference: . Also known as Whittets Mill. Originally a paper mill built in 1691. It was used as a corn mill until 1817 when it ceased to operate. From 1842 it was used as a linseed oil mill with a second wheel added. The mill was in operation until the 1960s when it was largely destroyed by fire. No trace of the mill remains. The site is now occupied by a residential development.

River Ock mills

Enton Mill

National Grid Reference: . A corn mill built c.1621.  It is now a private dwelling and incorporates the mast of a 19th-century tea clipper as the newel post of a spiral staircase. The mill features in a painting, Sheep Washing, by the 19th century artist, William Hull. It a Grade II listed building.

Rake Mill, Witley
National Grid Reference: . Originally a fulling mill dating from 1577. The mill was used by the artist Neville Lytton as a studio, but it, along with the bulk of Lytton's sketches and paintings, was destroyed by a fire in 1902.

Ockford Mill
National Grid Reference: . A 19th-century corn mill, it ceased working in 1934. It is currently used as a light industrial unit.

Hatch Mill, Godalming 
National Grid Reference: . A flour mill. Sections of the building date back to the 17th century. It ceased milling in 1950 but continued in use as a warehouse. Now known as the Old Mill, it houses a light industrial firm.

Mill Lane leather mill
National Grid Reference: . A 17th-century mill serving the tanneries of Godalming.  It burnt down twice in the 19th century but survived in use until it finally closed in 1953.

Cranleigh Waters mills

Cranleigh Mill
National Grid Reference: . A corn mill dating, in parts, to the 16th-century. It is a Grade II listed building. 

Wonersh Mill
National Grid Reference: . An 18th-century corn mill, it was modernized in 1885 with a water turbine replacing the wheel. It ceased milling in 1910 and is now used as storage.

Hascombe Mill
National Grid Reference: . Dating back to 1690, the mill ceased working in the late 1890s. Only a few ruins remain.

Snowdenham Mill
National Grid Reference: . Built around 1792, it was a corn mill and later a feed mill. Now abandoned but with its machinery still in situ. It was proposed as a candidate for restoration in 1979, but permission was not obtained and the building continues to deteriorate.

Bramley Mill
National Grid Reference: . A 17th-century corn mill on the site of an earlier fulling mill. Ceased working in 1931 and converted to domestic accommodation in 1935.

Tillingbourne mills

The Tillingbourne is the main tributary of the Wey and 24 mill sites have been identified along its course.

Brookmill
National Grid Reference: . Established in the 16th century, possibly as a gunpowder mill

Friday Street Upper Mill
National Grid Reference: . On the Friday Street stream tributary.

Friday Street Mill
National Grid Reference: . On the Friday Street Stream tributary. Both corn and malt mills existed here from about 1579 until closed in 1736. There is speculation that it may have also been used for iron working.

Wotton House Mill
National Grid Reference:  No trace remains.

Crane's Mill
National Grid Reference: . Also called Abinger Mill. Paddington MillNational Grid Reference: . A corn mill until 1915, it was subsequently used as a watercress store. Converted to private housing by 2017 at latest.Abinger Hammer MillNational Grid Reference: . A hammer mill constructed by 1557 on the site of an earlier corn mill. Production ceased in 1787 and, despite attempts to establish a gunpowder mill on the site, the mill fell out of use.Sutton MillNational Grid Reference: . On the Holbury St Mary Stream tributary. Possibly a 14th-century fulling mill and corn mill.Gomshall Mill 
National Grid Reference: . A corn mill that ceased milling in 1953. In 1964 it was converted into a pub and restaurant. The machinery is still in situ having been refurbished and forms a "feature" of the bar.Gomshall TanneryNational Grid Reference: . Still in operation into the 1980s. Destroyed by fire in 1992.Netley MillNational Grid Reference: . Also known as Shere Mill, it operated as a corn mill until 1907. It was used as a pumping station from 1970. Since converted to private accommodation.Shere Lower MillNational Grid Reference: . No trace remains.Shere West MillNational Grid Reference: . A corn mill.Albury Park MillNational Grid Reference: . Originally a corn mill, it was converted to a paper mill in 1793.  It ceased working by 1810 and was then used as a laundry.Albury MillNational Grid Reference: . A medieval corn mill that was burnt down in an arson attack in 1830. The arsonist was executed for the attempted murder of the miller. Rebuilt in brick and fitted with water turbines to provide power to Albury Park. It has recently been converted for use as offices and private accommodation.Postford Upper MillNational Grid Reference: . Built in 1809 as a paper mill producing paper for bank-notes. Closed by 1875.Postford Lower MillNational Grid Reference: . Built in 1809 as a paper mill producing paper for bank-notes. After paper production ceased in the 1870s it was converted for use as a corn mill. it was renamed Albury Mill in the 20th Century.  Also known as Bottings Mill, after its last owners. The last working commercial mill on the river, it ceased milling in 1991. It was demolished in 1996 and the site redeveloped.Postford House MillNational Grid Reference: . Built in the 1830s after the conversion of the upper and lower mills to paper making. Closed in 1865.Chilworth Gunpowder MillsNational Grid References: , . The gunpowder mills were originally developed by the East India Company from 1625. Divided between the Lower, Middle and Upper Works, it was a complex of up to 14 mills, later including steam-powered mills, and continued in use until 1920. The site of the middle and upper works is now a scheduled monument administered by Guildford Borough Council.Chilworth Great MillNational Grid Reference: . Built as a paper mill producing paper for bank-notes. Ceased production and closed in the 1870s.Chilworth Little MillBuilt as a paper mill producing paper for bank-notes. Ceased production and closed in the 1870s.East Shalford MillNational Grid Reference: .Shalford MillNational Grid Reference: . A corn mill and grist mill, listed Grade II*, It finally ceased production in 1914. It was rescued from dereliction by  Ferguson's Gang in 1932 and donated to the National Trust.

Hodge Brook millsPirbright MillNational Grid Reference: . A corn mill and timber mill from the early 19th century. Now converted to a private dwelling but with much of the machinery still in situ.Heath Mill, WorplesdonNational Grid Reference: . Built in 1902 to replace an earlier mill destroyed by fire. Now a private dwelling.Rickford's Mill, WorplesdonNational Grid Reference: . An 18th century corn mill now converted to a private dwelling.

East Clandon Stream millsOckham MillNational Grid Reference: . Built in 1862 to replace a previous mill destroyed by fire. The building is in the style of those owned by the Earl of Lovelace and is a Grade II listed building. It ceased milling in 1927 and remained derelict until 1958 when it was converted into a private dwelling.  The owner has subsequently had the machinery professionally restored.Clandon Mill'''
National Grid Reference: . No trace remains.

See also
Watermill for the different types of mill and their uses.
Hammer mill
Fulling mill
Corn, grist and feed mills
List of watermills in the United Kingdom

References

Rivers of Surrey
Rivers of Hampshire
Wey catchment
Watermills in Surrey
United Kingdom